Eleanor Emily Hodgman Porter (December 19, 1868 – May 21, 1920) was an American novelist, most known for Pollyanna (1913) and Just David (1916).

Biography
Eleanor Emily Hodgman was born in Littleton, New Hampshire, on December 19, 1868, the daughter of Llewella French ( Woolson) and Francis Fletcher Hodgman. She was trained as a singer, attending the New England Conservatory for several years. In 1892 she married John Lyman Porter and relocated to Massachusetts, after which she began writing and publishing her short stories and, later, novels. She died in Cambridge, Massachusetts, on May 21, 1920, and was buried at Mount Auburn Cemetery.

Works
Porter wrote mainly children's literature, adventure stories, and romance fiction. Her most famous novel is Pollyanna (1913), followed by a sequel, Pollyanna Grows Up (1915).

Her adult novels include The Turn of the Tide (1908), The Road to Understanding (1917), Oh Money! Money! (1918), Dawn (1919), Keith's Dark Tower (1919), Mary Marie (1920) and Sister Sue (1921); her short-story collections include Across the Years (c. 1919), Money, Love and Kate (1923), and Little Pardner (1926).

Porter achieved considerable commercial success: Pollyanna ranked eighth among best-selling novels in the United States during 1913, second during 1914, and fourth during 1915 (with 47 printings between 1915 and 1920); Just David ranked third in 1916; The Road to Understanding ranked fourth in 1917; and Oh Money! Money! ranked fifth in 1918.<ref></
f>

Bibliography

Short stories

A Delayed Heritage
A Four-Footed Faith and a Two
A Matter of System
A Mushroom of Collingsville
A Patron of Art
Angelus
Crumbs
Millionaire Mike's Thanksgiving
That Angel Boy
The Apple of Her Eye

The Daltons and the Legacy
The Elephant's Board and Keep
The Folly of Wisdom
The Glory and the Sacrifice
The Indivisible Five
The Lady in Black
The Letter
The Saving of Dad
When Mother Fell Ill
When Polly Ann Played Santa Claus
Women in Black

Novels
Cross Currents (1907)
The Turn of the Tide (1908)
The Story of Marco (1911)
Miss Billy (1911)
Miss Billy's Decision (1912)
Pollyanna (1913)
The Sunbridge Girls at Six Star Ranch (1913)
Miss Billy Married (1914)
Pollyanna Grows Up (1915)
Just David (1916)
The Road to Understanding (1917)
Oh, Money! Money! (1918)
The Tangled Threads (1919)
Dawn (1919)
Mary Marie (1920)

References

External links

 
 
  
 
 PBS biography
 Papers at Dartmouth
 

1868 births
1920 deaths
American children's writers
Burials at Mount Auburn Cemetery
New England Conservatory alumni
People from Littleton, New Hampshire